Find My Friends (called "Find Friends" on the SpringBoard) was a mobile phone tracking app and service for iOS devices developed by Apple Inc. Both Find My iPhone and Find My Friends were combined into the app Find My in iOS 13 and iPadOS 13 in 2019.

Overview 
The app allowed a person approved by the user, who also had to have an Apple device, to access the GPS location of the user's Apple mobile device. The app could be used to track children, family, and friends, besides others such as employees, without them being notified that they are being tracked. The app could also track the location of a person as a safety measure.

The Find My Friends app enabled a person approved by a user to follow and track them with their iOS device(s). Users could also share their location with people they choose. According to Apple, there was a maximum of 100 trackers ("friends").

The tracker could also receive notifications when the user left or arrived at a new place. Location was determined using GPS in the iOS device when Location Services were turned on. The apps required that the device's Location Services be turned on for the app. Modified software allowed notifications to appear when a user requested a tracker to see where they are or was turned on through the message application. It could also be accepted through Facebook sharing options. The feature could be turned on and off at any time.

Like many iOS applications that used Location Services, parental controls were available. Find My Friends synchronized with other applications such as Maps and Contacts. The app was supported on the iPhone, iPod Touch, iPad, Apple Watch, or on iCloud.com on Windows. A friend's location could be viewed in OS X 10.10 as well, by clicking "Details" in the top right corner of the Messages App.

Privacy considerations 
The app raised potential privacy issues arising from the tracking of a user's exact location, without users being notified that they are being tracked. Several safety features allowed a user to share their location only with people they choose and turn off the permission at any time. "Friends" could only track users who had accepted their access request. The user could remove them from access at any time or only make the tracking temporary.

Another way to turn the tracking off was to turn Location Services off. This was done by going to Settings > Privacy > Location Services, selecting the app in the list and selecting the "Never" option. Tracking could be turned back on by selecting the "While Using the App" option. Location services and hence location tracking did not operate when a device was in "Airplane mode".

History
Find My Friends was announced on October 4, 2011, the day before Steve Jobs’ death, and released on October 12, 2011, several hours before the actual release of iOS 5.

iOS 6 added location-based alerts to notify the user when a device arrived at a set location.

In October 2015, Find My Friends was added to iCloud.com to view the location of friends.

Prior to iOS 9, the app could downloaded from the App Store free of charge. With the launch of iOS 9 (released in September 2015), the app was bundled and installed by default; it could not be uninstalled. iOS 11 added the ability for uninstallation.

As of iOS 13 and macOS Catalina, Find My Friends was discontinued with its function merged with Find My iPhone for iOS and Find My Mac for macOS into a new app called Find My.

See also
Find My iPhone
 Google Latitude
 Life360
 iPhone 4S
 iCloud

References

IOS
IOS software
Internet geolocation
Satellite navigation software
Discontinued software